The Constitution of the Solomon Islands is the supreme law of the Solomon Islands.

It was approved on 31 May 1978 and entered into force on 7 July 1978 at the point of independence from the United Kingdom.

References

External links
Constitution of Solomon Islands 

Solomon Islands
Government of the Solomon Islands